"May We All" is a song recorded by American country music group Florida Georgia Line and country music artist Tim McGraw. It is the second single from the duo's third studio album, Dig Your Roots, which was released on August 26, 2016. The song was written by Rodney Clawson and Jamie Moore. "May We All" was first released for sale on July 16, 2016 by Republic Nashville as an album and released as a single to radio in August.

Commercial performance
"May We All" debuted at number 27 on the Hot Country Songs chart, selling 22,000 copies in its first week as a pre-release track for the album. It has since reached number two on that chart. It was the most added song on its official US radio add date in August. It first appeared on the Country Airplay chart at number 51, and rose to number 34 the following week. It reached number one on the Country Airplay chart in December. It became Florida Georgia Line's ninth top 40 and seventh top 30 hit on the pop chart. It is Tim McGraw's thirty-second top 40 and twenty-second top 30 hit on the pop chart. To date, this is McGraw’s 29th and last number one song.

As of July 2017, the song had sold 635,000 copies in the United States. It was certified double Platinum by the RIAA on December 12, 2018.

Music video
The music video was directed by TK McKamy and premiered in August 2016. The video consists of Brian and Tyler as racecar drivers and Tim McGraw as the owner of the cars. The drivers are friends at first but fight after Tyler puts Brian into the wall at the end of the second race. They reconcile after Brian spins Tyler out and ends up flipping Tyler's car. Brian then goes to help Tyler get out of the car. Tyler's car catches on fire then the car explodes with Tyler in it while his daughter looks on and yells, "Daddy!" and starts to cry. Against track official orders, Brian pushes the fire fighters away before he rushes in and pulls Tyler out of the burning wreckage. The video ends with Tyler asking Brian if he won with Brian responding "Yeah, buddy. We all Did." The video has them acting only (without singing), the first FGL video to do so. The video was shot in Hohenwald, Tennessee.

Charts

Weekly charts

Year-end charts

Certifications

References

2016 songs
2016 singles
Florida Georgia Line songs
Tim McGraw songs
Republic Nashville singles
Vocal collaborations
Songs written by Rodney Clawson
Song recordings produced by Joey Moi
Music videos directed by TK McKamy
Country ballads
Republic Records singles